Janbaaz is a 1986 Indian action drama film, produced and directed by Feroz Khan, which became popular for its portrayal of drug addiction and Anil Kapoor and Dimple Kapadia's sex scene. Sridevi appeared in a cameo appearance, capitalising on her superstardom, Khan featured her in the song "Har Kisiko Nahi Milta Yahan Pyaar Zindagi Mein" which became a chart-topping hit. The movie is greatly inspired by King Vidor's movie Duel in the Sun (1946).

The film was a hit at box office. Dimple Kapadia's performance, with her chemistry and love making scene with co-star Anil Kapoor, was much appreciated and is considered to be one of her best.

Plot 
Rana Vikram Singh lives in a huge farmhouse with his wife, Laxmi and two sons: Rajesh, a police officer and Amar, a fun-loving playboy. Amar's entry begins with him playing a round of loaded Russian Roulette which he wins and proclaims himself jaanbaaz.

Rajesh has gone through a traumatic experience of losing his love Seema, when she succumbed to drug injection delivered forcibly by Teja, an international narcotics mafia leader. He vows to fight the drug menace. An underworld kingpin Raja murders Rana's old friend. Reshma, his friend's daughter, takes shelter in Rana's house. Rajesh is on the drug trail. Reshma's father lost a huge bet (by being tricked) to Raja, after which Raja killed him in a fake accident.

When Reshma goes to live with them, Amar makes out with her in a horse stable. After savoring Reshma, Amar refuses to marry her. When Rana learns of Amar's relationship with Reshma, he warns him that Reshma is not suitable for their family. Reshma is heartbroken but continues to move on with her life. Amar maintains an interest and is jealous to see Reshma in the company of Vikas, an employee at the farmhouse. A fight ensues between Vikas and Amar, and Vikas is killed. Amar is now on the run, and Rajesh has been assigned the task of apprehending him.

Cast 
 Feroz Khan as Rajesh
 Anil Kapoor as Amar Singh
 Amrish Puri as Rana Vikram Singh
 Sushma Seth as Laxmi Singh
 Dimple Kapadia as Reshma
 Sridevi as Seema (special appearance)
 Shakti Kapoor as Raja
 Raza Murad as Teja
 Puneet Issar as Rocky
 Dalip Tahil as Vikas
 Rekha as an item number in the song "Pyar Do Pyar Lo"
 Tej Sapru as John

Production 
Dimple Kapadia's role as Reshma was initially offered to Rekha.

Soundtrack 
The soundtrack was composed by Kalyanji-Anandji. The song "Har Kisi Ko" was later re-worked by Chirantan Bhatt for Boss (2013). The song "Pyaar Do Pyar Lo was recreated twice for Thank You (2011 film) and Marjaavaan, which the song is renamed as Ek To Kum Zindagani.

References

External links 
 

1986 films
1980s Hindi-language films
Indian romantic action films
Indian romantic musical films
Indian erotic romance films
Films about drugs
1980s romantic action films
1980s romantic musical films
1980s erotic films
Films scored by Kalyanji Anandji
Films shot in Ooty
Films directed by Feroz Khan
Indian remakes of American films
1980s masala films